Peter Noel Rees (born 5 May 1932) is a Welsh former amateur footballer, who played as an inside forward in the Football League for Tranmere Rovers.

References

Tranmere Rovers F.C. players
Association football inside forwards
English Football League players
1932 births
Living people
Welsh footballers
People from Machynlleth
Sportspeople from Powys
Wales amateur international footballers
Llanidloes Town F.C. players